The Nanjing University of Science and Technology, colloquially NJUST, is one of the National Key Universities under the Ministry of Industry and Information Technology of China. It is a science-oriented university located in Xuanwu District in the east suburban area of Nanjing. The university is included in the Chinese state Double First Class University Plan.

History 
The Nanjing University of Science and Technology can be traced back to 1953, as Department of Artillery Engineering of Institute of Military Engineering of the PLA (People's Liberation Army) in Harbin. Since its establishment, it aims on serving national strategies and promoting social progress. In 1962, the campus moved to Nanjing. The name of the university changed many times, and finally determined as current name in 1993. In September 1998, the name on the school badge was inscribed by Chinese President and General Secretary of the Communist Party Jiang Zemin. Since June 2008, the Nanjing University of Science and Technology has been subordinated to the Ministry of Industry and Information Technology.

Academics 
The Nanjing University of Science and Technology is a multidisciplinary university, comprising academic fields including science, engineering, liberal arts, economics, business, management, law and education. In addition, it encompasses a wide array of centers, institutes, programs, and administrative support offices. It carries on its education and research on both undergraduate and postgraduate levels in 15 schools, led by a total of 70 undergraduate majors, 116 master programs and 49 doctoral programs, and 14 post-doctoral research stations.

NJUST is one of the Seven Sons of National Defence.

Project 211, 985 and the Double First Class University Plan 
The Nanjing University of Science and Technology has become a National Key University of Project 211 in 1995. In 2000, the Ministry of Education approved NJUST to start the graduate school. Later in 2011, the university was authorized to build 985 Advantage Discipline Innovation Platform.

In September 2017, the Nanjing University of Science and Technology was included in the Chinese state Double First Class University Plan identified by the Ministry of Education of China.

Schools and departments 
As of June 2018, the Nanjing University of Science and Technology has the following colleges and schools:

School of Mechanical Engineering
School of Chemical Engineering
School of Electronic Engineering and Optoelectronic Technology
School of Computer Science and Technology
School of Economics and Management
School of Energy and Power Engineering
School of Automation
School of Science
School of Foreign Studies
School of Public Affairs
School of Materials Science and Engineering
School of Environmental and Biological Engineering
School of Design and Communication
Tsien Hsue-Shen College
School of Intellectual Property
School of Marxism
School of International Education
School of Continuing Education
Sino-French Engineer School
Zijin College
Taizhou Institute of Science and Technology
Graduate School

Campus 
Different from many universities in Nanjing, the Nanjing University of Science and Technology has only one main campus based in Xiaolingwei, Xuanwu District, on the south of Purple Mountain and the Sun Yat-sen Mausoleum. It covers a total area of 3,118 mu (207.87 ha). Undergraduates and graduate students of shares the same main campus.

In 1998, Zijin College of NJUST was founded in Xianlin University City, Nanjing. In June 2004, the Taizhou Institute of Science and Technology was founded in Taizhou, Jiangsu, as a branch institute of the Nanjing University of Science and Technology.

Notable alumni 
潘德炉, leading researcher of ocean color remote sensing in China, CAE member
李鸿志, CAE member
Wang Zeshan, CAE member
刘怡昕, CAE member
陈志杰, CAE member
Ren Xinmin, aerospace engineer and specialist in astronautics and liquid rocket engine technology, CAS member
邢球痕, solid rocket motor scientist, CAS member
Lu Ke, material scientist, CAS member 
崔向群, astronomer, CAS member
田禾, fine chemistry expert, CAS member
李应红, aeronautical propulsion theory and engineering expert, CAS member
芮筱亭, emission dynamics scientist, CAS member
Lu Zhangong, Vice Chairman of the Chinese People's Political Consultative Conference

Notes

References

External links 

 
1953 establishments in China
Educational institutions established in 1953
Technical universities and colleges in China
Universities and colleges in Nanjing